Simon Ekeno (born 10 February 1946) is a Kenyan former sports shooter. He competed in the 50 metre rifle, prone event at the 1972 Summer Olympics.

References

1946 births
Living people
Kenyan male sport shooters
Olympic shooters of Kenya
Shooters at the 1972 Summer Olympics
Commonwealth Games competitors for Kenya
Shooters at the 1974 British Commonwealth Games
Place of birth missing (living people)
20th-century Kenyan people